SonicAluzion is the debut/only album by the Canadian rock group Smashing Satellites. The album was released June 16, 2015 through the band's own label Aluzion Records.

Recording and release

Smashing Satellites recorded their debut EP and debut album at Cody Hanson from Hinders production studio "Back-Lounge Productions", the band released their debut EP "SonicAluzion (A-Side)" on September 30, 2014. The EP consisted of 5 tracks and included their debut single "Hounds" and hit single "Waterfall".

April 13, 2015 the band announced that their debut album would be titled "SonicAluzion" and that it will be released June 16, 2015. The album will feature 11 tracks, including the 5 tracks previously released on their debut EP and the other remaining tracks would be previously unheard.

Track listing

Personnel
Smashing Satellites
Salvatore Costa - lead vocals, rhythm guitar
Mick Valentyne - keyboards, rhythm guitar
Mykey Thomas - drums, backing vocals
Devon Lougheed - bass, backing vocals

References

Smashing Satellites albums
2015 debut albums